Mamedli  may refer to:
Mamedli, Imishli, Azerbaijan
Mamedli, Qubadli, Azerbaijan

See also
Məmmədli (disambiguation)